Christian Ernst II, Duke of Saxe-Coburg-Saalfeld (Saalfeld, 18 August 1683 – Saalfeld, 4 September 1745), was a duke of Saxe-Coburg-Saalfeld.

Life 
He was the oldest surviving son of Johann Ernst, Duke of Saxe-Coburg-Saalfeld and his first wife, Sophie Hedwig of Saxe-Merseburg.

In Naitschau on 18 August 1724, Christian Ernst married unequally with Christiane Fredericka of Koss; for this, his younger half-brother Franz Josias reclaimed the full succession of the duchy. His father, the duke Johann Ernst, determined the common government of the brothers with indivisibility of the duchy upon his death, in 1729. Christian Ernst made his residence in Saalfeld and Franz Josias moved into the Veste Coburg.

The double government soon proved impossible, and this forced the settlement of the "Coburg Eisenberg Roemhilder of Hereditary Controversy", whereby Christian Ernst received Coburg, Rodach, Mönchröden and half Neuhaus. Christian Ernst died childless and all his inheritance was taken by his half-brother, Franz Josias.

Ancestors

References 
 August Beck: Christian Ernst, Herzog zu Sachsen-Saalfeld. In: Allgemeine Deutsche Biographie (ADB). Band 4, Duncker & Humblot, Leipzig 1876, S. 180.

1683 births
1745 deaths
Dukes of Saxe-Coburg-Saalfeld
Dukes of Saxe-Saalfeld
Dukes of Saxe-Coburg
Recipients of the Order of the White Eagle (Poland)